Cynthia Maideyi Muvirimi is a Zimbabwean-born model who represented Zimbabwe in the Miss World 2008 pageant.

Early life
The twelfth of thirteen children, Muvirimi was born in Harare. She attended Cecil John Rhodes Junior School and went on to Thornhill High, both in Gweru, Zimbabwe. Muvirimi received a diploma in Nursing and an Honorary Bachelor of Science degree from London Southbank University.

Muvirimi has participated in pageants since her high school days. In 1999, she was named Miss Thornhill High and later that year she went on to win the Miss Midlands Schools title.

Pageants
Muvirimi was first runner-up in the UK-based Miss Malaika 2006 pageant.

On 3 June 2007, at the Pegasus Hotel in Kingston, Jamaica, Muvirimi won the title of Miss Global International, and in December of that same year, she won the title of Miss Tourism Zimbabwe, earning a shot at the 2008 Miss World final title in Johannesburg, South Africa on 13 December 2008.

References

External links

 Miss World Official Site
 Miss Tourism Zimbabwe Official Website
 Miss Global International Official Website
 Miss Malaika UK

Miss World 2008 delegates
1983 births
Living people
People from Harare
Zimbabwean models
Zimbabwean beauty pageant winners
21st-century Zimbabwean women
21st-century Zimbabwean people